Batkun Peak is the peak rising to 881 m in the southeast foothills of Detroit Plateau on Nordenskjöld Coast in Graham Land, Antarctica.  It is situated in the west part of Grivitsa Ridge, surmounting Darvari Glacier to the north and Zaychar Glacier to the south.

The peak is named after the settlement of Batkun in Southern Bulgaria.

Location
British mapping in 1978.

Maps
 British Antarctic Territory.  Scale 1:200000 topographic map.  DOS 610 Series, Sheet W 64 60.  Directorate of Overseas Surveys, UK, 1978.
 Antarctic Digital Database (ADD). Scale 1:250000 topographic map of Antarctica. Scientific Committee on Antarctic Research (SCAR). Since 1993, regularly upgraded and updated.

Notes

References
 Batkun Peak. SCAR Composite Antarctic Gazetteer.
 Bulgarian Antarctic Gazetteer. Antarctic Place-names Commission. (details in Bulgarian, basic data in English)

External links
 Batkun Peak. Copernix satellite image

Mountains of Graham Land
Bulgaria and the Antarctic
Nordenskjöld Coast